Santiago González Iglesias (born 16 June 1988 in Buenos Aires) is an Argentine rugby union player who plays as a fly-half for the San Diego Legion of Major League Rugby (MLR). He also plays for Asociación Alumni.

Iglesias was also a member of Pampas XV.

He has 46 caps for Argentina, since his debut in the 89-6 win over Chile, at 20 May 2009, in Montevideo, for the South American Rugby Championship, Division 1. He has scored 7 tries, 36 conversions and 12 penalties, in an aggregate of 143 points. He was a regular player and captain for Argentina Jaguars.

Santiago was part of the national team that competed at the 2015 Rugby World Cup.

References

External links

1988 births
Living people
Argentine rugby union players
Argentina international rugby union players
Asociación Alumni players
Jaguares (Super Rugby) players
Pampas XV players
Rugby union fly-halves
Rugby union players from Buenos Aires
Rugby union centres
Munakata Sanix Blues players
San Diego Legion players